Gargoyle is the tenth studio album by American singer Mark Lanegan (credited to "Mark Lanegan Band"). It was released in April 2017 on Heavenly Recordings. It was produced by Lanegan's long-time collaborator Alain Johannes. Roughly half of the music on the record was written by UK-based Rob Marshall through e-mail exchanges with Lanegan, who would write lyrics subsequently.

While retaining much of the tenebrous imagery of previous records, Gargoyle arguably marks a step toward somewhat a lighter sound, as noted by reviewer Kieron Tyler: "Everything expected is present and correct: the bottom-of-the-boots voice; lugubrious yet affecting melodies; an ominous mood; lyrics dwelling on life’s dark corners. Even so, Gargoyle is an uplifting album, one allowing the sun to peak from behind a cloud."

Track listing

Personnel
 Mark Lanegan – vocals (1–10)
 Alain Johannes – verb guitar (1), bass (1,6,9), Prophet 5 (1,2,3,5,9), harmonium (2,3), Moog (2,3), Mellotron (2,3,5,9), B-3 (5,6), tremolo guitar (5,9), shaman drum (5), guitar (6), Farfisa (6), harpsichord (6), percussion (6), E-Bow (9), backing vocals (9), drum programming (9)
 Rob Marshall – bass (1,2,4,10), guitar (1,2,4,8,10), synthesizer (1,10), drum programming (1,4,8,10), drum loops (2,8), acoustic guitar (7), electric guitar (7), drums (7), piano (7), horns (10)
 Greg Dulli – backing vocals (1), acoustic guitar (4), Moog (4)
 Duke Garwood – horns (5), guitar (5)
 Martyn LeNoble – bass (2,4,7,8), melody bass (2)
 Frederic Lyenn Jacques – bass (5)
 Jean-Philippe de Gheest – drums (5)
 Jack Irons – drums (2,4,6,8)
 Aldo Struyf – piano (2,3), ARP (2,3,9), percussion (2,3,9)
 Shelley Brien – backing vocals (3,5)
 Josh Homme – backing vocals (6)

Charts

Accolades

References

2017 albums
Mark Lanegan albums
Albums produced by Alain Johannes
Heavenly Recordings albums